Splash Planet is an amusement park and water park located in the city of Hastings, New Zealand. The park was opened in its current form in 1998.

Fantasyland
Fantasyland first opened in Easter of 1967. It contained several attractions, including a miniature railway, mini-golf, a steamboat ride, play structures, and flat rides. By the 1990s, the park was beginning to show its age, and the Hastings District Council proposed that it be redeveloped into a waterpark. At the time of its conception the council had decided that the park would be a money spinner and was certain that it would supplement the taxes that local residents paid. The park was also hoped to attract people from outside the region to visit the region and spend money not only at the park but also at local business within the city.

Construction
Construction of the new waterpark facilities was done by Alexander Construction, a local company who has worked on many other large attractions within Hawke's Bay. Work began in July 1998, and finished before the new year, taking only 4.5 months to complete. This was done at a cost of $4,700,000.

Referendum
Before Splash Planet left the drawing board the Hastings District Council put the decision on whether or not Splash Planet would be built to public referendum. The referendum outlined a number of policies in an attempt to gain the locals' confidence. These policies included the fact that Splash Planet would be self-sustaining and would not cost the taxpayers any money.

Financial Woes
Despite being sold to rate payers as a money making venture plash Planet will lose about $800,000 in the current 2009 fiscal year. In fact, the soon-to-be-released LTCCP projects it will lose about $800,000+ each year for the next ten years that’s $8.3 million.

Covid19  and staffing issues forced the park to close for a period and close early exacerbating losses to rate payers.

Attractions

The park contains several wet and dry attractions.

"Wet" attractions
 Double Dipper - Inline tube slide
 Super Cruiser - Open body slide
 Sky Tunnel - Enclosed body slide
 Master Blaster - Heated open/enclosed body slide
 Sky Castle Screamer - Pair of racing body slides
 Never Ending River - A lazy river
 Bumper boats
 Indoor heated pool

"Dry" attractions

 Fantasyland Express - A miniature railway ride originally part of Fantasyland
 Formula Fun Karts - Go-karts
 Jungle Jeeps - Motorized jeep racing, slower than go-karts
 Flying Fox - Two 40 meter flying foxes
 Mini golf
 Tiny Town - Young children's play area
 Beach volleyball
 Pétanque

Former attractions
Pirate Ship- a play structure that was burnt down by arsonists in 2015. The ship, built mainly by volunteers and an original attraction when the park was first established as Fantasyland in 1967, was ablaze when the first of three fire crews from Hastings and Napier arrived after the alarm was raised at 6:01am.

Battle of Hastings Paintball Event
In late 2013 a major paintball event known as the Battle of Hastings took place at Splash Planet. It drew players from around New Zealand to compete in massive paintball battles. The event was held again in October 2014

References

Water parks in New Zealand
Amusement parks in New Zealand
1967 establishments in New Zealand
Amusement parks opened in 1967
Hastings, New Zealand